The 2010 Rally Scotland was the 11th round of the 2010 Intercontinental Rally Challenge and the second running of the event. The event was held between 15 – 17 October 2010 in the forests of Stirling and Perth & Kinross. Four of the special stages were broadcast live on Eurosport.

Introduction

The forest rally was based in Perth, with a ceremonial start and the initial two stages being held at Scone Palace in the dark on the Friday evening. Saturday consisted of three routes (each run twice) covering . Sunday had an additional two routes again run twice, before the ceremonial finish at Stirling Castle.

Thierry Neuville made his debut on the rally which was described by his Kronos Racing team mate Kris Meeke as the best in the world.

By starting the event, Juho Hänninen became IRC champion after Škoda Motorsport elected not to send Jan Kopecký to the event.

Results
Juho Hänninen cemented his championship title with victory on a rally of attrition with just ten of the 21 starters finishing the rally.

Overall

Special stages

References

External links
 The official website for the rally
 The official website of the Intercontinental Rally Challenge

Rally
Scotland
Rally Scotland
Scotland